Murat Yıldırım may refer to:

Murat Yıldırım (actor) (born 1979), Turkish actor
Murat Yıldırım (footballer) (born 1987), Turkish professional footballer

See also 
 Murat (name)